Owen Swift (1814– 9 June 1879) was a British bare-knuckle prize fighter, who killed three men in boxing bouts. The death of "Brighton Bill" in one particularly savage 85-round bout in 1838, and Swift's subsequent conviction for manslaughter, led to the adoption of the London Prize Ring Rules.

Career
His 1 June 1837 fight with Israel "London Izzy" Lazarus (the father of Harry Lazarus) is recounted in detail in Frank Lewis Dowling's 1855 book, Fights for the Championship; and Celebrated Prize Battles; Or Accounts of All the Prize Battles for the Championship &c.  Swift was the outsider, and at odds of 6 to 4, bet on himself to win. Swift was much the lighter man, at no more than nine stone (57 kg; 130 lb) in weight, with "not an ounce of superfluous flesh on his ribs". The odds on both fighters changed many times, and each was "within an ace of losing". The fight lasted 113 rounds, two hours and fifteen minutes, and Lazarus was "dreadfully punished", and it was his last ever fight.

After one of his fights in 1838, which lasted 85 rounds and 95 minutes, Swift's opponent, William Phelps, known as "Brighton Bill", died.  The fight took place at Melbourne Heath, Essex, in front of a crowd of about 3,000. Phelps — who had already killed a man — became the third man Swift killed. Bets were taken that neither man would survive for long after the fight; Swift was very badly beaten, making his eventual recovery doubtful.

After the coroner's inquest, Swift was tried and found guilty of manslaughter, as were three of the organisers. In 1839, The Annual Register described the fight as "one of the most savage 'pieces of sport' that has disgraced the country for several years".

This event led to the rules of boxing being rewritten. The London Prize Ring Rules were introduced by the Pugilists's Protective Association and replaced Broughton's rules of 1743. There were 29 rules, built on Broughton's rules, but with more depth and detail. These rules more clearly defined the range of fouls and introduced certain safety measures.

Swift's last two fights were both with Jack Adams, on  5 June and 5 September 1838, both in France. Swift won both fights. Afterwards, Swift became a tavern owner, running the Horse Shoe in Tichborne Street (now Glasshouse Street), Soho, London.

In 1840, Swift published The Hand-book to Boxing, which was a defence of the sport, a history of boxing, a guide for spectators, and advice on how to train and fight.

Death
Swift died in 1879. He is buried at Kensal Green Cemetery.

Homonym
Another professional boxer active in 1931–1932, Forest Hall, also used the name Owen Swift.

Publications

See also
Simon Byrne
Charles Lecour

References

External links

1814 births
1879 deaths
19th-century English people
Bare-knuckle boxers
Burials at Kensal Green Cemetery
English male boxers